Spanish Stroll is a 1977 single by Mink DeVille, off their debut album Cabretta. It features a spoken word section by bassist Rubén Sigüenza during the break ("¡Hey Rosita! ¿Dónde vas con mi carro, Rosita? Tú sabes que te quiero, pero usted me quita todo"), adding a Latin flavor to it.

"Spanish Stroll" reached #20 on the UK Singles Chart; it was to be DeVille's only record ever to chart in the UK. In addition, the song went to #3 in the Netherlands and #25 in New Zealand.

In 2000, the UK indie-pop band Spearmint sampled the song on the title track of their album Oklahoma!.

In 2007, the song was featured in the American drama film  In the Land of Women.

In 2010, the song was featured in the independent video game Space Funeral.

In 2016, the song was featured in the made for Netflix film Special Correspondents.

References

1977 singles
1977 songs
Capitol Records singles